Pokaniewo-Kolonia  is a village in the Administrative District of Gmina Milejczyce, within Siemiatycze County, Podlaskie Voivodeship, in northeastern Poland.

The village has a population of 180.

References

Pokaniewo-Kolonia